Sun Wizard are a band formed in Vancouver in 2008 by James Younger, Malcolm Jack, and Francesco Lyon, with Ben Frey joining the band later on.

They self-released their first EP 'When They Were Right' in the summer of 2009. This attracted local indie label Light Organ Records and they went on to release their first seven-inch 'Quit Acting Cold' in the summer of 2010. This was later followed by Positively 4th Avenue, their first full-length album. Positively 4th Avenue was recorded by Colin Stewart and Dave Ogilvie and featured two singles, 'World's Got A Handle', and 'Middle Of My Heart'.

After Sun Wizard, James Younger released a solo album named 'Feelin' American', Malcolm Jack formed Capitol 6, releasing 'Pretty Lost' with them and released his first solo album named 'I'm My Own Bewitchment'. Jack also formed Dada Plan releasing 'A Dada Plan is Free" in 2014. Ben Frey joined The Shilohs, releasing 'So Wild' with the band.

References

Musical groups from Vancouver
Musical groups established in 2008
2008 establishments in British Columbia